J. Hugh Nichols (November 27, 1930 – December 8, 2015) served as the County Executive of Howard County, Maryland.

Biography 
Born in Sprott, Alabama, Nichols served in the United States Army. He then received his bachelor's degree in political science and history from University of Alabama in 1957 and his master's degree in public administration from American University in 1967. From 1971 to 1978, Nichols served in the Maryland House of Delegates. Nichols served one term as part of the Howard County Charter Commission after ballots were contested for not having enough signature to qualify. In February 1968, he became a member of the planning commission as Columbia Maryland was undergoing its first phases of construction. He left the post in November 1968 to run for the new position of Howard County Council.

In the 1970s Nichols helped form the Maryland State Lottery. He would later work with the Lottery Board of Louisiana to help form their lottery in the 1990s. Nichols became a Maryland State Delegate from 1971-1978. In 1975, he proposed all school instruction materials would need to be screened for content before purchase. In 1976, he was part of a Maryland State delegation to China. In 1978 he was the deputy secretary for State budget and planning.

As Howard County Executive, Nichols vetoed bills that prevented hired council on bond issues from having an interest in the issues recommended.

Nichols later went to work for the firm of Mendez England Associates. In August 1996 Nichols had to leave his assignment in Albania after United States missile strikes against Osama Bin Laden raised concerns of retaliation strikes. Six years later, Howard County's Pin-Del-Motel, and Valencia Motel were used by terrorists loyal to Bin Laden prior to the September 11th attacks.

Nichols worked on a free-market economic plan in Poland for eight weeks. He later retired in Maplesville, Alabama. During a 1998 visit to Howard County, he commented that he spent a fair amount of time just to keep from getting lost. "The county has grown faster than I anticipated". He died on December 8, 2015 in Maplesville, Alabama.

Election history

Nichols had ambitions to run for Maryland Governor, changing his party affiliation from Democrat to Republican to compete against William Donald Schaefer. He switched after phone calls from vice president George Bush and petitions were submitted. Two days later he took an economic development mission for Howard County in Barcelona, Spain. Working against an overwhelming financial lead, Nichols opted for another career track. In July 1986, Nichols left his office to work for a utility conglomerate: Entergy, in New Orleans, Louisiana.. The County Council chose William E. Eakle to fill his position.

In September 1978, Nichols won the Democratic primary for the office of Howard County Executive, against incumbent Edward L. Cochran by 3000 votes. In the fall of 1985, Nichols converted to the Republican party in an attempt to run for Maryland Governor. The Democratic party insisted that he turn over $3,335 of contributions left over from his $34,796 Democratic campaign fund.

References

External links 

1930 births
2015 deaths
People from Chilton County, Alabama
People from Perry County, Alabama
American University School of Public Affairs alumni
University of Alabama alumni
Members of the Maryland House of Delegates
County commissioners in Maryland
Maryland Democrats
Maryland Republicans
Howard County Executives